Artwell Nyambanje (born 10 February 1991) is a Zimbabwean cricketer. He made his List A debut in his only List A appearance for Mid West Rhinos against Southern Rocks in 2012.

References

External links 
 

1991 births
Living people
Zimbabwean cricketers
Mid West Rhinos cricketers
Sportspeople from Bindura